Carlos Alberto "El Chispa" Gastélum (born October 29, 1979) is a Mexican former professional baseball player of the Mexican League and Naranjeros de Hermosillo, as well as Venados de Mazatlán in the Mexican Pacific League in the winter. He started practicing baseball at the age of three years in his native Huatabampo, Sonora in the infancy category of a team called Ibarra Hermanos Ceballos. Gastélum often wears the number 5 on his uniform, as his firstborn child was born on the 5th.

Career
Gastélum joined the Tigres de Quintana Roo of the Mexican League for the 2005 season, and played with the club through the 2018 season. He became a free agent after the 2018 season and on April 3, 2019, he signed with the Pericos de Puebla. On October 4, 2019, Gastélum retired from professional baseball.

References

External links

1979 births
Living people
Baseball players from Sonora
Boise Hawks players
Butte Copper Kings players
Cedar Rapids Kernels players
Lake Elsinore Storm players
Mexican expatriate baseball players in the United States
Mexican League baseball outfielders
Mexican League baseball second basemen
Mexican League baseball shortstops
Naranjeros de Hermosillo players
People from Huatabampo
Pericos de Puebla players
Rancho Cucamonga Quakes players
Tigres de Quintana Roo players
Venados de Mazatlán players